Battle axe is a weapon.

Battleaxe, battle axe, or battle ax may also refer to:

Military
 Operation Battleaxe, a British World War II operation in North Africa, 1941
 No. 7 Squadron IAF, nicknamed "Battle Axes"
 The 78th Infantry Division (United Kingdom), also known as the Battleaxe Division
 74 Battery (The Battle Axe Company) Royal Artillery
 The 65th Infantry Division (United States), nicknamed "Battle-Axe"
 Carrier Air Wing Three, an aircraft carrier air wing of the United States Navy, nicknamed "Battle Axe"

Ships
 Several ships in the Royal Navy have been called HMS Battleaxe:
 HMS Battleaxe (D118), a Weapon-class destroyer
 HMS Battleaxe (F89), a Type 22 frigate
 HMS Empire Battleaxe, a landing-ship
 ST Battleaxe, a tugboat

Arts and culture
 Battleaxe (band), a heavy metal music band from the 1980s
 An instrumental piece composed by Carlos Cavazo on Quiet Riot's breakthrough album Metal Health
 "Battle-axe", a song by Deftones, from their 2003 album Deftones
 Battleaxe (novel) a 1995 novel by Sara Douglass
 Battleaxe (comics), Marvel comics character
 Battle Axe (album), a 2018 album by Sharon Needles, or the title song

Other
 Battle-axe (woman), an aggressive, domineering and forceful woman
 Battle Ax, a shield volcano in the Cascade Range of Oregon
 Corded Ware culture, sometimes known as "Battle Axe culture"
 The Varangians, sometimes known as "Battle-axe Guards"

See also

 
 
 
 
 
 
 
 
 
 
 Battle (disambiguation)
 Axe (disambiguation)
 Ax (disambiguation)
 Warhammer (disambiguation)